Ingrid Burrington (born 1987) is a writer and artist based out of Brooklyn, New York. She graduated from the Maryland Institute College of Art and has since had her work appear in numerous publications including The Atlantic, The Nation, and San Francisco Arts Quarterly. Burrington published Networks of New York: An Illustrated Field Guide to Urban Internet Infrastructure with Melville House Publishing in 2016. She has also participated in numerous residencies, held teaching positions, and presented talks and workshops to the public. Burrington is currently represented as an artist by NOME, an art gallery focused on raising awareness about current issues and based in Berlin. She is also a founding member of Deep Lab.

Career 
Burrington's career, which began with a focus on art and data visualization, shifted toward the field of network infrastructure in 2013 after the leaking of the Snowden files. It was then that she became interested in what the inside of the internet looked like, beyond what the media was trying to depict. This eventually lead Burrington to write her book, Networks of New York, where she uses over fifty illustrations to help readers understand and outline the urban Internet infrastructure. 

Over the course of Ingrid's career, she has received noteworthy grants and held positions with organizations such as:

 Eyebeam Art and Technology Center (October 2017 - October 2018) - Journalism Resident 
 Experimental Research Lab at Autodesk/Pier 9 (February 2016 - June 2016) - Fellow
 Center for Land Use Interpretation (September 2015) - Resident
 Knight Foundation Prototype Fund with Surya Mattu (2015) - Grantee
 Frank-Ratchye STUDIO for Creative Inquiry, Carnegie Mellon University (Winter 2014) - Resident
 Data and Society Research Institute (2014-2015) - Fellow
 Eyebeam Art and Technology Center (Spring 2014) - Resident
 The Wassaic Project (Fall 2013) - Resident
 Lower Manhattan Cultural Council Swingspace Program (Fall 2011) - Resident

Burrington has also held adjunct teaching positions at Cooper Union (2018), Rhode Island School of Design (2017), and School for Poetic Computation (2015-2016). As of spring 2020 she is involved in the Humans in Residence (HIRs) program within the NYU Tische School of The Arts.

Selected events and exhibitions
Some of the most recent events and exhibitions that have displayed her work include: 

 Future Perfect - Data and Society Research Institute (June 7-8, 2018)
 Futureproof - Haverford College, PA (October 27 - December 17, 2017)
 Haunted Machines, Wicked Problems - Impakt Festival, NL (October 25 - November 12, 2017)
 The Glass Room - London, United Kingdom (October 25 - November 12, 2017)
 Infosphere - CENART, Mexico City, Mexico (May 25 - September 3, 2017)
 To Serve The National Interest - Ace Hotel Gallery, New York, NY. (April 5 - April 28, 2017)
 Evidentiary Realism - Fridman Gallery, New York City, NY. (February 28 - March 31, 2017)
 Reconnaissance - NOME Gallery, Berlin, DE. (September 17 - November 11, 2016)
 THE NEXT BIG THING IS NOT A THING: Surveying the Design Discipline - Bureau Europa, Maastricht, NL (March 5 - June 10, 2016)
 Big Band Data - Somerset House, London, United Kingdom. (December 3, 2015 - March 20, 2016)

References 

1987 births
Maryland Institute College of Art alumni
Living people
Writers from Brooklyn
21st-century American women writers